Warriors of God is a historical novel with fantasy elements, written by Andrzej Sapkowski. It is the sequel to Narrenturm in the Hussite Trilogy. Its events take place in Bohemia and Silesia, during the time of Hussite Wars.

The trilogy is to be published in late August 2021 by Orbit in the US and Gollancz in the UK, who have purchased the rights. It will be translated by David French, who has worked with Sapkowski on The Witcher series.

Plot 
The plot of the book Warriors of God follows the previous part of Sapkowski's trilogy, Narrenturm. The reader mainly follows the protagonist of the whole story, the Silesian nobleman, doctor and mage Reinmar from Bělava, who after his escape from Silesia joined the Czech Hussites and became a member of the hussite military group called the orphans.

Reinmar, who became an ardent supporter of the chalice after leaving home, went to northern Bohemia together with his friend Šarlej, who had become a member of the Tábor union in an effort to acquire property.

It was there that they decided to look for the wizard Rupilius Slezák, with whose help their mysterious friend and alleged astral Samson Medák would be able to return to his world. Reynevan, who was also being followed in Bohemia by the Silesian Inquisition and the servants of the bishop of Wrocław, was captured by his enemies in Trosky Castle, from where he was only able to escape with the help of the sorcerer Rupilia.

References

External links 

Andrzej Sapkowski's official page

Polish fantasy novels
2004 novels
Novels set in Poland
Novels set in Czechoslovakia
Polish historical novels
21st-century Polish novels
Hussite Trilogy